Three Amigos (stylized as ¡Three Amigos!) is a 1986 American Western comedy film directed by John Landis, written by Lorne Michaels, Steve Martin, and Randy Newman (who also wrote the film's songs), and starring Martin, Chevy Chase, Martin Short, Alfonso Arau, Tony Plana, and Patrice Martinez. It is the story of three American silent film stars who are mistaken for real heroes by the suffering people of a small Mexican village. The actors must find a way to live up to their reputation and stop a malevolent group of bandits.

Plot
In 1916, the bandit El Guapo and his gang collect protection money from the Mexican village of Santo Poco. Carmen, daughter of the village leader, searches for someone who can rescue her townspeople. Visiting a village church, she sees a silent film featuring The Three Amigos, a trio of gunfighters who protect the vulnerable from villains. Believing them to be real heroes, Carmen sends a telegram asking them to come and stop El Guapo.

Lucky Day, Dusty Bottoms, and Ned Nederlander, the actors who portray the Amigos, demand a salary increase for their next project and are fired by their boss Harry Flugelman. He has them evicted from the studio mansion, banned from his lot, and the clothes they borrowed from wardrobe repossessed. They soon receive Carmen's telegram, misinterpreting it as a job offer to perform a show in Santo Poco. The Amigos break into the studio to retrieve their costumes and head for Mexico.

Stopping at a cantina near Santo Poco, they are mistaken for associates of a fast-shooting German pilot who arrived just before they did, also in search of El Guapo. They perform "My Little Buttercup" at the cantina, confusing the locals. The German's real associates arrive at the cantina, proving themselves lethal with their pistols when everybody laughs at them. Relieved, Carmen picks up the Amigos and takes them to the village, where they are pampered in the best house in town.

The next morning, when three of El Guapo's men raid the village, the Amigos do a Hollywood-style stunt show that leaves the men bemused. The bandits ride off, making the villagers think they have defeated the enemy. In reality, the men inform El Guapo of what has happened and he decides to return the next day to kill the Amigos.

The village throws a victory party for the Amigos. The next morning, El Guapo and his gang come to Santo Poco and call them out, but they think it's another show. After Lucky gets shot, they realize they are confronting real bandits and beg for mercy. El Guapo allows the Amigos to live, then lets his men loot the village and kidnaps Carmen. They leave Santo Poco in humiliation.

Ned persuades Lucky and Dusty to go after El Guapo as they have nothing worth going back to in America and this is their chance to be real heroes. They spot a plane and follow it; it is flown by the German, who has brought a shipment of rifles for the gang. El Guapo's 40th birthday party is being prepared and he plans to bed Carmen that night. The Amigos fling themselves over the wall to infiltrate the hideout with mixed results: Lucky is immediately captured and chained in a dungeon, Dusty crashes into Carmen's room, and Ned ends up suspended from a piñata.

Lucky frees himself, but Dusty and Ned are discovered and held hostage. The German, having idolized Ned's quick-draw and gun-spinning pistol skills in childhood, challenges him to a shootout. Ned kills the German and Lucky holds El Guapo at gunpoint long enough for Carmen and the Amigos to escape in the German's plane.

Returning to Santo Poco with El Guapo's army in pursuit, the Amigos rally the villagers to stand up for themselves. The villagers are uncertain as all they are good at is sewing. Drawing inspiration from one of their films, they have the villagers create improvised Amigos costumes. The bandits arrive, are shot at by Amigos from all sides, and fall into hidden trenches. El Guapo's men either ride off or are shot, and he takes a fatal wound. Before he dies, the villagers, dressed as Amigos, step out to confront him. El Guapo congratulates them, then shoots Lucky in the foot before dying.

The villagers offer the Amigos all the money they have, but the Amigos refuse it with: "Our reward is that justice has been done." They then ride off into the sunset.

Cast
 Chevy Chase as Dusty Bottoms, a silent film actor.
 Steve Martin as Lucky Day, a silent film actor.
 Martin Short as Ned Nederlander, a silent film actor.
 Alfonso Arau as "El Guapo", the leader of a group of banditos.
 Tony Plana as "Jefe", El Guapo’s second in command.
 Patrice Martinez as Carmen, the daughter of the head of the village.
 Joe Mantegna as Harry Flugleman, the head of Goldsmith Pictures that Lucky, Dusty, and Ned work for.
 Phil Hartman as Sam, one of Flugleman's personal assistants.
 Jon Lovitz as Morty, one of Flugleman's personal assistants.
 Tino Insana as Studio Guard
 Loyda Ramos as Conchita
 Phillip Gordon as Rodrigo
 Kai Wulff as The German, an unnamed German fighter pilot.
 Fred Asparagus as The Bartender
 Norbert Weisser and Brian Thompson as The German's friends
 Randy Newman as Voice of the Singing Bush
 Rebecca Underwood as Hot Senorita (kisses Ned at the close of the film)

Production
The film was written by Martin, Michaels, and Randy Newman. According to Michaels, Martin approached him with the idea for the film and asked him to co-write it. Martin originally had the working title Three Caballeros, the same as the Disney cartoon.

Newman contributed three original songs: "The Ballad of the Three Amigos", "My Little Buttercup", and "Blue Shadows on the Trail", and the musical score was composed by Elmer Bernstein. It was shot outside Grants, New Mexico, and in Simi Valley, California; Coronado National Forest; Old Tucson Studios; Culver City and Hollywood.

John Landis was on trial over the Twilight Zone tragedy during the editing of Three Amigos, and the studio heavily edited the film down after he submitted his final cut.

Martin's performance of the lasso tricks during the movie was a skill he had learned when he was working at Disneyland in his 20s.

The production went through many cast changes before filming. Martin had been attached to the project since 1980 and he, Dan Aykroyd, and John Belushi were originally going to star. At one point, Steven Spielberg was slated to direct; he wanted Martin, Bill Murray, and Robin Williams to play Lucky, Dusty, and Ned, respectively. Landis has said that Rick Moranis would have been cast as Ned had Short been unavailable. When Aykroyd became unavailable, Chase replaced him. John Candy was set for the role originally intended for Belushi, but was too large to ride a horse. Candy recommended Short to Martin, as they had worked together at SCTV. Martin and Short became close friends and continue to perform together. Candy was later seen riding a horse in the 1991 film Delirious. While Steve Martin has top billing in some posters as well as DVD covers today, Chevy Chase has top billing in the film itself.

Martin reportedly developed tinnitus after filming a pistol-shooting scene. But in an interview with Pitchfork, he clarified that the tinnitus was from years of listening to loud music and performing for noisy crowds.

There were difficulties between the main actors and Landis. Most famously, Chase refused to tell a particular joke that he thought would make his character look like a "moron". Chase agreed to do the line after Landis threatened to give it to Short instead. Chase recalled making a "hideous" insult about Landis's supposed lack of stunt precautions at a 50-foot cliff, in reference to Landis's ongoing Twilight Zone accidental death trial, which Landis overheard on live microphone and nearly started a fistfight over. Chase later said that making this movie was "the most fun I've ever had".

Deleted scenes
Several deleted scenes were included in the Blu-ray release. An alternative opening features Santo Poco being pillaged by El Guapo and his men, prompting Carmen's search for help. Extended sequences of the Three Amigos at the studio mansion and backlot lead into another deleted subplot involving an up-and-coming rival actress at the studio, Miss Rene (Fran Drescher). A billboard featuring a Miss Rene film is visible when the Amigos steal their costumes from the studio.

A number of deleted scenes featuring Sam Kinison as a mountain man were lost, as were most of Drescher's other scenes.

Music
Elmer Bernstein wrote the score for Three Amigos and Randy Newman wrote the songs.
 "The Ballad of the Three Amigos"
 "Main Title"
 "The Big Sneak"
 "My Little Buttercup"
 "Santo Poco"
 "Fiesta and Flamenco"
 "El Guapo"
 "The Return of the Amigos"
 "Blue Shadows on the Trail"
 "The Singing Bush"
 "Amigos at the Mission"
 "Capture"
 "El Guapo's Birthday"
 "The Chase”
 "Amigos, Amigos, Amigos"
 "Farewell"
 "End Credits"

Reception

Box office
Three Amigos grossed $39.2 million in the U.S.

Critical response
On Rotten Tomatoes the film holds an approval rating of 45% based on 42 reviews, with an average rating of 5.2/10. The site's critical consensus reads, "Three Amigos! stars a trio of gifted comedians and has an agreeably silly sense of humor, but they're often adrift in a dawdling story with too few laugh-out-loud moments." On Metacritic it has a weighted average score of 52 out of 100, based on 13 critics, indicating "mixed or average reviews". Audiences surveyed by CinemaScore gave the film an average grade "B" on an A+ to F scale.

Roger Ebert of the Chicago Sun-Times gave the film one star out of four, writing, "The ideas to make Three Amigos into a good comedy are here, but the madness is missing." Janet Maslin of The New York Times wrote that it was "likable" but lacked a "distinctive style", though certain jokes are crafted with "enjoyable sophistication". Caroline Wetsbrook of Empire awarded the film three out of five stars and wrote that it was "good-natured enough to sustain its ultimately thin premise".

The film has since been reviewed more favorably and has become a cult classic. Neil McNally of the website Den of Geek noted that the film was "unfairly overlooked" when first released, and praised the performances of Martin, Chase, and Short; the comedic timing of Landis's direction; and Bernstein's "sweeping, majestic" score. The film was ranked 79th on Bravo's list of the "100 Funniest Movies".

See also
 List of films featuring fictional films

References

External links

 
 
 Interviews with the Stars of Three Amigos (1986) on Texas Archive of the Moving Image

1980s Western (genre) comedy films
1986 comedy films
1986 films
1980s buddy comedy films
American independent films
American satirical films
American Western (genre) comedy films
1980s English-language films
Fictional trios
Films about actors
Films set in Los Angeles
Films set in Mexico
Films set in 1916
Films shot in Los Angeles
Films shot in Tucson, Arizona
Films produced by Lorne Michaels
Films directed by John Landis
Films produced by George Folsey Jr.
Films scored by Elmer Bernstein
Films with screenplays by Steve Martin
HBO Films films
Orion Pictures films
1980s American films